The 1946 Texas A&I Javelinas football team was an American football team that represented the Texas College of Arts and Industries (now known as Texas A&M University–Kingsville) as an independent during the 1946 college football season. In their first season under head coach Dewey Mayhew, the Javelinas compiled a 2–7 record and were outscored by a total of 201 to 52.

Schedule

References

Texas AandI
Texas A&M–Kingsville Javelinas football seasons
Texas AandI Javelinas football